Eastward Ho! Harold Land in New York is an album by American saxophonist Harold Land recorded in late 1960 and released on the Jazzland label.

Reception

Allmusic awarded the album 4 stars calling it "A fine effort that serves as a strong example of Harold Land's early work". The Penguin Guide to Jazz Recordings comments that while Dorham and Land both play well, they don’t interact as well as they might have.

Track listing
All compositions by Harold Land except as indicated
 "So in Love" (Cole Porter) - 5:58  
 "Triple Trouble" (Amos Trice) - 5:46  
 "Slowly" (Kermit Goell, David Raksin) - 6:59  
 "'On a Little Street in Singapore" (Peter DeRose, Billy Hill) - 7:07  
 "Okay Blues" - 12:23

Personnel
Harold Land - tenor saxophone
Kenny Dorham - trumpet
Amos Trice - piano
Clarence Jones - bass
Joe Peters - drums

References

 

Jazzland Records (1960) albums
Harold Land albums
1960 albums
Albums produced by Orrin Keepnews